Poljanska may refer to:

 Poljańska, a village in Poland
 Poljanska, Croatia, a village near Velika, Croatia